Ministry of National Education can refer to:
 Ministry of National Education (Algeria)
 Ministry of National Education (Colombia)
 Ministry of National Education (France)
 Ministry of National Education and Religious Affairs (Greece)
 Ministry of National Education (Haiti)
 Ministry of National Education (Italy)
 Ministry of National Education (Morocco)
 Ministry of National Education (Poland)
 Ministry of National Education (Romania)
 Ministry of National Education (Turkey)